Bold Power Station refers to a series of two coal-fired power stations in Bold near St Helens, Merseyside, North West England. They were closed, decommissioned and demolished between 1981 and 1992, and a housing estate now occupies the site.

History
Bold A and B Power Stations were coal fired, with a direct coal conveyor belt link from a washery at the colliery. This fed either directly to coal bunkers in both stations or to a stocking area. The extensive rail sidings were utilised for coal delivery, either from Bold Colliery or from other collieries via the main Liverpool to Manchester Lines. The coal from Bold Colliery was deep mined and therefore costly to recover. In later years, due to commercial reasons, the main coal supply became mostly by road from either Yorkshire or Scotland.

The 'A' power station had an installed capacity of 120 MW. It consisted of four 30 MW two-cylinder turbines/alternators manufactured by Metropolitan-Vickers and Associated Electrical Industries (AEI). No.3 M/C was installed with the first direct water-cooled alternator. Steam was supplied from four Yarrow & Co. coal-fired boilers with tangentially fired tilting pulverized fuel burners, with 3no type LM13 table mills made by International Combustion of Derby.

The 'B' power station was installed with three 60 MW machines (equalling 180 MW total capacity). It used a central unit control system with the turbine/hydrogen cooled alternators manufactured by the General Electric Company (GEC). As with 'A' power station, no.3 alternator was a prototype direct water-cooled machine. The coolant water was fed via glass tubes on the three-phase connections. Each unit had boilers manufactured by John Thompson of Wolverhampton, each using two suction ball mills each with two exhausters, these feeding to twelve front wall pulverized fuel burners. The boilers were rated at 69 kg/s and fed steam at 900 psi/900 degrees Fahrenheit (62.06 bar and 482 °C) directly to each turbine/alternator.

The electricity output from Bold A was as follows:

The electricity output from Bold B was as follows:

The Bold area was the site of Bold Colliery, with Bold A and B Power Stations on adjacent land. These power stations had a total electricity generating capacity of 300 megawatts (MW). At the time of completion, between 1958 and 1960, they were the largest such generating facility in the north west. Bold "A" Station closed on 26 October 1981. Bold "B" continued to run until the late 80's after it was privatised from the Central Electricity Generating Board to National Power. The B Station closed in 1991 and was soon after demolished, with the site’s 3 cooling towers and chimney demolished on the 29th March 1992. The site has since been redeveloped for housing and public open spaces.  Other industry in the area included a large engineering works which is now an industrial estate.

See also 

 St Helens power station

References

Buildings and structures in the Metropolitan Borough of St Helens
Coal-fired power stations in England
Power stations in North West England